The Dust Bowl was a period of severe dust storms that greatly damaged the ecology and agriculture of the American and Canadian prairies during the 1930s. The phenomenon was caused by a combination of both natural factors (severe drought) and manmade factors (a failure to apply dryland farming methods to prevent wind erosion, most notably the destruction of the natural topsoil by settlers in the region). The drought came in three waves: 1934, 1936, and 1939–1940, but some regions of the High Plains experienced drought conditions for as many as eight years.

The Dust Bowl has been the subject of many cultural works, notably the novel The Grapes of Wrath (1939) by John Steinbeck, the folk music of Woody Guthrie, and photographs depicting the conditions of migrants by Dorothea Lange, particularly the Migrant Mother, taken in 1936.

Geographic characteristics and early history
With insufficient understanding of the ecology of the plains, farmers had conducted extensive deep plowing of the virgin topsoil of the Great Plains during the previous decade; this had displaced the native, deep-rooted grasses that normally trapped soil and moisture even during periods of drought and high winds. During the drought of the 1930s, the unanchored soil turned to dust, which the prevailing winds blew away in huge clouds that sometimes blackened the sky. Associated Press reporter Robert E. Geiger happened to be in Boise City, Oklahoma, to witness the "Black Sunday" black blizzards of April 14, 1935; Edward Stanley, the Kansas City news editor of the Associated Press, coined the term "Dust Bowl" while rewriting Geiger's news story.

While the term "the Dust Bowl" was originally a reference to the geographical area affected by the dust, today it usually refers to the event itself (the term "Dirty Thirties" is also sometimes used). The drought and erosion of the Dust Bowl affected  that centered on the Texas Panhandle and Oklahoma Panhandle and touched adjacent sections of New Mexico, Colorado, and Kansas. The Dust Bowl forced tens of thousands of poverty-stricken families, who were unable to pay mortgages or grow crops, to abandon their farms, and losses reached $25 million per day by 1936 (equivalent to $ million in ). Many of these families, who were often known as "Okies" because so many of them came from Oklahoma, migrated to California and other states to find that the Great Depression had rendered economic conditions there little better than those they had left.

The Dust Bowl area lies principally west of the 100th meridian on the High Plains, characterized by plains which vary from rolling in the north to flat in the Llano Estacado. The region is also prone to extended drought, alternating with unusual wetness of equivalent duration. During wet years, the rich soil provides bountiful agricultural output, but crops fail during dry years. The region is also subject to high winds.
During early European and American exploration of the Great Plains, this region was thought unsuitable for European-style agriculture; explorers called it the Great American Desert. The lack of surface water and timber made the region less attractive than other areas for pioneer settlement and agriculture.

The federal government encouraged settlement and development of the Plains for agriculture via the Homestead Act of 1862, offering settlers ”quarter section”  plots. With the end of the Civil War in 1865 and the completion of the First transcontinental railroad in 1869, waves of new migrants and immigrants reached the Great Plains, and they greatly increased the acreage under cultivation. An unusually wet period in the Great Plains mistakenly led settlers and the federal government to believe that "rain follows the plow" (a popular phrase among real estate promoters) and that the climate of the region had changed permanently. While initial agricultural endeavors were primarily cattle ranching, the adverse effect of harsh winters on the cattle, beginning in 1886, a short drought in 1890, and general overgrazing, led many landowners to increase the amount of land under cultivation.

Recognizing the challenge of cultivating marginal arid land, the United States government expanded on the  offered under the Homestead Actgranting  to homesteaders in western Nebraska under the Kinkaid Act (1904) and  elsewhere in the Great Plains under the Enlarged Homestead Act of 1909. Waves of European settlers arrived in the plains at the beginning of the 20th century. A return of unusually wet weather seemingly confirmed a previously held opinion that the "formerly" semiarid area could support large-scale agriculture. At the same time, technological improvements such as mechanized plowing and mechanized harvesting made it possible to operate larger properties without increasing labor costs.

The combined effects of the disruption of the Russian Revolution, which decreased the supply of wheat and other commodity crops, and World War I increased agricultural prices; this demand encouraged farmers to dramatically increase cultivation. For example, in the Llano Estacado of eastern New Mexico and northwestern Texas, the area of farmland was doubled between 1900 and 1920, then tripled again between 1925 and 1930. The agricultural methods favored by farmers during this period created the conditions for large-scale erosion under certain environmental conditions. The widespread conversion of the land by deep plowing and other soil preparation methods to enable agriculture eliminated the native grasses which held the soil in place and helped retain moisture during dry periods. Furthermore, cotton farmers left fields bare during winter months, when winds in the High Plains are highest, and burned the stubble as a means to control weeds prior to planting, thereby depriving the soil of organic nutrients and surface vegetation.

Drought and dust storms

After fairly favorable climatic conditions in the 1920s with good rainfall and relatively moderate winters, which permitted increased settlement and cultivation in the Great Plains, the region entered an unusually dry era in the summer of 1930. During the next decade, the northern plains suffered four of their seven driest calendar years since 1895, Kansas four of its twelve driest, and the entire region south to West Texas lacked any period of above-normal rainfall until record rains hit in 1941. When severe drought struck the Great Plains region in the 1930s, it resulted in erosion and loss of topsoil because of farming practices at the time. The drought dried the topsoil and over time it became friable, reduced to a powdery consistency in some places. Without the indigenous grasses in place, the high winds that occur on the plains picked up the topsoil and created the massive dust storms that marked the Dust Bowl period. The persistent dry weather caused crops to fail, leaving the plowed fields exposed to wind erosion. The fine soil of the Great Plains was easily eroded and carried east by strong continental winds.

On November 11, 1933, a very strong dust storm stripped topsoil from desiccated South Dakota farmlands in one of a series of severe dust storms that year. Beginning on May 9, 1934, a strong, two-day dust storm removed massive amounts of Great Plains topsoil in one of the worst such storms of the Dust Bowl. The dust clouds blew all the way to Chicago, where they deposited  of dust. Two days later, the same storm reached cities to the east, such as Cleveland, Buffalo, Boston, New York City, and Washington, D.C. That winter (1934–1935), red snow fell on New England.

On April 14, 1935, known as "Black Sunday", 20 of the worst "black blizzards" occurred across the entire sweep of the Great Plains, from Canada south to Texas. The dust storms caused extensive damage and appeared to turn the day to night; witnesses reported that they could not see  in front of them at certain points. Denver-based Associated Press reporter Robert E. Geiger happened to be in Boise City, Oklahoma, that day. His story about Black Sunday marked the first appearance of the term Dust Bowl; it was coined by Edward Stanley, Kansas City news editor of the Associated Press, while rewriting Geiger's news story.

Much of the farmland was eroded in the aftermath of the Dust Bowl. In 1941, a Kansas agricultural experiment station released a bulletin that suggested reestablishing native grasses by the "hay method". Developed in 1937 to speed up the process and increase returns from pasture, the "hay method" was originally supposed to occur in Kansas naturally over 25–40 years. 

After much data analysis, the causal mechanism for the droughts can be linked to ocean temperature anomalies. Specifically, Atlantic Ocean sea surface temperatures appear to have had an indirect effect on the general atmospheric circulation, while Pacific sea surface temperatures seem to have had the most direct influence.

Human displacement

This catastrophe intensified the economic impact of the Great Depression in the region.

In 1935, many families were forced to leave their farms and travel to other areas seeking work because of the drought (which at that time had already lasted four years). The abandonment of homesteads and financial ruin resulting from catastrophic topsoil loss led to widespread hunger and poverty. Dust Bowl conditions fomented an exodus of the displaced from the Texas Panhandle, Oklahoma Panhandle, and the surrounding Great Plains to adjacent regions. More than 500,000 Americans were left homeless. More than 350 houses had to be torn down after one storm alone. The severe drought and dust storms had left many homeless; others had their mortgages foreclosed by banks, or felt they had no choice but to abandon their farms in search of work. Many Americans migrated west looking for work. Parents packed up "jalopies" with their families and a few personal belongings, and headed west in search of work. Some residents of the Plains, especially in Kansas and Oklahoma, fell ill and died of dust pneumonia or malnutrition.

Between 1930 and 1940, approximately 3.5 million people moved out of the Plains states. In just over a year, over 86,000 people migrated to California. This number is more than the number of migrants to that area during the 1849 gold rush. Migrants abandoned farms in Oklahoma, Arkansas, Missouri, Iowa, Nebraska, Kansas, Texas, Colorado, and New Mexico, but were often generally referred to as "Okies", "Arkies", or "Texies". Terms such as "Okies" and "Arkies" came to be known in the 1930s as the standard terms for those who had lost everything and were struggling the most during the Great Depression.

However, not all migrants traveled long distances; most migrants participated in internal state migration moving from counties that the Dust Bowl highly impacted to other less affected counties. So many families left their farms and were on the move that the proportion between migrants and residents was nearly equal in the Great Plains states.

An examination of Census Bureau statistics and other records, and a 1939 survey of occupation by the Bureau of Agricultural Economics of about 116,000 families who arrived in California in the 1930s, showed that only 43 percent of Southwesterners were doing farm work immediately before they migrated. Nearly one-third of all migrants were professional or white-collar workers. Specifically for farmers, while some of them had to take on unskilled labor when they moved, leaving the farming sector commonly led to greater social mobility in the future as there was a far greater likelihood that migrant farmers would later go into semi-skilled or high-skilled fields which paid better. Non-farmers experienced more downward occupational moves than farmers, but in most cases they were not significant enough to bring them into poverty, because high-skilled migrants were most likely to experience a downward shift into semi-skilled work. While semi-skilled work did not pay as well as high-skilled work, most of these workers were not impoverished. For the most part, by the end of the Dust Bowl the migrants generally were better off than those who chose to stay behind according to their occupational changes.

After the Great Depression ended, some migrants moved back to their original states. Many others remained where they had resettled. About one-eighth of California's population is of Okie heritage.

Government response 

The greatly expanded participation of government in land management and soil conservation was an important outcome from the disaster. Different groups took many different approaches to responding to the disaster. To identify areas that needed attention, groups such as the Soil Conservation Service generated detailed soil maps and took photos of the land from the sky. To create shelterbelts to reduce soil erosion, groups such as the United States Forestry Service's Prairie States Forestry Project planted trees on private lands. Finally, groups like the Resettlement Administration, which later became the Farm Security Administration, encouraged small farm owners to resettle on other lands, if they lived in drier parts of the Plains.

During President Franklin D. Roosevelt's first 100 days in office in 1933, his administration quickly initiated programs to conserve soil and restore the ecological balance of the nation. Interior Secretary Harold L. Ickes established the Soil Erosion Service in August 1933 under Hugh Hammond Bennett. In 1935, it was transferred and reorganized under the Department of Agriculture and renamed the Soil Conservation Service. It is now known as the Natural Resources Conservation Service (NRCS).

As part of New Deal programs, Congress passed the Soil Conservation and Domestic Allotment Act in 1936, requiring landowners to share the allocated government subsidies with the laborers who worked on their farms. Under the law, "benefit payments were continued as measures for production control and income support, but they were now financed by direct Congressional appropriations and justified as soil conservation measures. The Act shifted the parity goal from price equality of agricultural commodities and the articles that farmers buy to income equality of farm and non-farm population." Thus, the parity goal was to re-create the ratio between the purchasing power of the net income per person on farms from agriculture and that of the income of persons not on farms that prevailed during 1909–1914.

To stabilize prices, the government paid farmers and ordered more than six million pigs to be slaughtered, as part of the Agricultural Adjustment Act (AAA). It paid to have the meat packed and distributed to the poor and hungry. The Federal Surplus Relief Corporation (FSRC) was established to regulate crop and other surpluses. FDR in an address on May 14, 1935, to the AAA commented,

Let me make one other point clear for the benefit of the millions in cities who have to buy meats. Last year the Nation suffered a drought of unparalleled intensity. If there had been no Government program, if the old order had obtained in 1933 and 1934, that drought on the cattle ranges of America and in the corn belt would have resulted in the marketing of thin cattle, immature hogs and the death of these animals on the range and on the farm, and if the old order had been in effect those years, we would have had a vastly greater shortage than we face today. Our programwe can prove itsaved the lives of millions of head of livestock. They are still on the range, and other millions of heads are today canned and ready for this country to eat.

The FSRC diverted agricultural commodities to relief organizations. Apples, beans, canned beef, flour and pork products were distributed through local relief channels. Cotton goods were later included, to clothe needy.

In 1935, the federal government formed a Drought Relief Service (DRS) to coordinate relief activities. The DRS bought cattle in counties which were designated emergency areas, for $14 to $20 a head. Animals determined unfit for human consumption were killed; at the beginning of the program, more than 50 percent were so designated in emergency areas. The DRS assigned the remaining cattle to the Federal Surplus Relief Corporation (FSRC) to be used in food distribution to families nationwide. Although it was difficult for farmers to give up their herds, the cattle slaughter program helped many of them avoid bankruptcy. "The government cattle buying program was a blessing to many farmers, as they could not afford to keep their cattle, and the government paid a better price than they could obtain in local markets."

President Roosevelt ordered the Civilian Conservation Corps to plant the Great Plains Shelterbelt, a huge belt of more than 200 million trees from Canada to Abilene, Texas to break the wind, hold water in the soil, and hold the soil itself in place. The administration also began to educate farmers on soil conservation and anti-erosion techniques, including crop rotation, strip farming, contour plowing, terracing, and other improved farming practices. In 1937, the federal government began an aggressive campaign to encourage farmers in the Dust Bowl to adopt planting and plowing methods that conserved the soil. The government paid reluctant farmers a dollar an acre to practice the new methods. By 1938, the massive conservation effort had reduced the amount of blowing soil by 65%. The land still failed to yield a decent living. In the fall of 1939, after nearly a decade of dirt and dust, the drought ended when regular rainfall finally returned to the region. The government still encouraged continuing the use of conservation methods to protect the soil and ecology of the Plains.

At the end of the drought, the programs which were implemented during these tough times helped to sustain a positive relationship between America's farmers and the federal government.

The President's Drought Committee issued a report in 1935 covering the government's assistance to agriculture during 1934 through mid-1935: it discussed conditions, measures of relief, organization, finances, operations, and results of the government's assistance.<ref>United States. Agricultural Adjustment Administration and Murphy, Philip G., (1935), Drought of 1934: The Federal Government's Assistance to Agriculture ". Accessed October 15, 2014.</ref> Numerous exhibits are included in this report.

Long-term economic impact
In many regions, more than 75% of the topsoil was blown away by the end of the 1930s. Land degradation varied widely. Aside from the short-term economic consequences caused by erosion, there were severe long-term economic consequences caused by the Dust Bowl.

By 1940, counties that had experienced the most significant levels of erosion had a greater decline in agricultural land values. The per-acre value of farmland declined by 28% in high-erosion counties and 17% in medium-erosion counties, relative to land value changes in low-erosion counties. Even over the long-term, the agricultural value of the land often failed to recover to pre-Dust Bowl levels. In highly eroded areas, less than 25% of the original agricultural losses were recovered. The economy adjusted predominantly through large relative population declines in more-eroded counties, both during the 1930s and through the 1950s.

The economic effects persisted, in part, because of farmers' failure to switch to more appropriate crops for highly eroded areas. Because the amount of topsoil had been reduced, it would have been more productive to shift from crops and wheat to animals and hay. During the Depression and through at least the 1950s, there was limited relative adjustment of farmland away from activities that became less productive in more-eroded counties.

Some of the failure to shift to more productive agricultural products may be related to ignorance about the benefits of changing land use. A second explanation is a lack of availability of credit, caused by the high rate of failure of banks in the Plains states. Because banks failed in the Dust Bowl region at a higher rate than elsewhere, farmers could not get the credit they needed to obtain capital to shift crop production. In addition, profit margins in either animals or hay were still minimal, and farmers had little incentive in the beginning to change their crops.

Patrick Allitt recounts how fellow historian Donald Worster responded to his return visit to the Dust Bowl in the mid-1970s when he revisited some of the worst afflicted counties:
Capital-intensive agribusiness had transformed the scene; deep wells into the aquifer, intensive irrigation, the use of artificial pesticides and fertilizers, and giant harvesters were creating immense crops year after year whether it rained or not. According to the farmers he interviewed, technology had provided the perfect answer to old troubles, such of the bad days would not return. In Worster's view, by contrast, the scene demonstrated that America's capitalist high-tech farmers had learned nothing. They were continuing to work in an unsustainable way, devoting far cheaper subsidized energy to growing food than the energy could give back to its ultimate consumers.

In contrast with Worster's pessimism, historian Mathew Bonnifield argued that the long-term significance of the Dust Bowl was "the triumph of the human spirit in its capacity to endure and overcome hardships and reverses."

Influence on the arts and culture

The crisis was documented by photographers, musicians, and authors, many hired during the Great Depression by the federal government. For instance, the Farm Security Administration hired numerous photographers to document the crisis. Artists such as Dorothea Lange were aided by having salaried work during the Depression. She captured what have become classic images of the dust storms and migrant families. Among her most well-known photographs is Destitute Pea Pickers in California. Mother of Seven Children, which depicted a gaunt-looking woman, Florence Owens Thompson, holding three of her children. This picture expressed the struggles of people caught by the Dust Bowl and raised awareness in other parts of the country of its reach and human cost. Decades later, Thompson disliked the boundless circulation of the photo and resented the fact she did not receive any money from its broadcast. Thompson felt it gave her the perception as a Dust Bowl "Okie."

The work of independent artists was also influenced by the crises of the Dust Bowl and the Depression. Author John Steinbeck, borrowing closely from field notes taken by Farm Security Administration worker and author Sanora Babb, wrote The Grapes of Wrath (1939) about migrant workers and farm families displaced by the Dust Bowl. Babb's own novel about the lives of the migrant workers, Whose Names Are Unknown, was written in 1939 but was eclipsed and shelved in response to the success of Steinbeck's work, and was finally published in 2004. Many of the songs of folk singer Woody Guthrie, such as those on his 1940 album Dust Bowl Ballads, are about his experiences in the Dust Bowl era during the Great Depression when he traveled with displaced farmers from Oklahoma to California and learned their traditional folk and blues songs, earning him the nickname the "Dust Bowl Troubadour".

Migrants also influenced musical culture wherever they went. Oklahoma migrants, in particular, were rural Southwesterners who carried their traditional country music to California. Today, the "Bakersfield Sound" describes this blend, which developed after the migrants brought country music to the city. Their new music inspired a proliferation of country dance halls as far south as Los Angeles.

The 2003–2005 HBO TV series Carnivàle was set during the dust bowl.

The 2014 science fiction film Interstellar features a ravaged 21st-century America which is again scoured by dust storms (caused by a worldwide pathogen affecting all crops). Along with inspiration from the 1930s crisis, director Christopher Nolan features interviews from the 2012 documentary The Dust Bowl to draw further parallels.

In 2017, Americana recording artist Grant Maloy Smith released the album Dust Bowl – American Stories, which was inspired by the history of the Dust Bowl. In a review, the music magazine No Depression wrote that the album's lyrics and music are "as potent as Woody Guthrie, as intense as John Trudell and dusted with the trials and tribulations of Tom JoadSteinbeck and The Grapes of Wrath."

 Changes in agriculture and population on the Plains 

Agricultural land and revenue boomed during World War I, but fell during the Great Depression and the 1930s. These twenty counties that the U.S. Department of Agriculture's Soil Conservation Service identified as the worst wind-eroded region were home to the majority of the Great Plains migrants during the Dust Bowl.

While migration from and between the Southern Great Plain States was greater than migration in other regions in the 1930s, the numbers of migrants from these areas had only slightly increased from the 1920s. Thus, the Dust Bowl and Great Depression did not trigger a mass exodus of southern migrants, it simply encouraged these migrants to keep moving where in other areas the Great Depression limited mobility due to economic issues, decreasing migration. While the population of the Great Plains did fall during the Dust Bowl and Great Depression, the drop was not caused by extreme numbers of migrants leaving the Great Plains but because of a lack of migrants moving from outside of the Great Plains into the region.

 See also 
1936 North American heat wave
Desertification
Goyder's Line – semiarid area of Australia
Global warming
List of environmental disasters
Monoculture
Ogallala Aquifer
Palliser's Triangle – semiarid area of Canada
Semi-arid climate
Tragedy of the commons
U.S. Route 66 – notable Dust Bowl migration route to California
Navajo Livestock Reduction – simultaneous program to prevent overgrazing and erosion

 References 

 Bibliography 

 Bonnifield, Mathew Paul. (1979) Dust Bowl: Men, Dirt and Depression Cunfer, Geoff. (2008) "Scaling the Dust Bowl" , Placing history: How maps, spatial data, and GIS are changing historical scholarship, ESRI Press, Redlands.
 Gregory, James Noble. American exodus: The dust bowl migration and Okie culture in California (Oxford University Press, 1989)
 Lassieur, Allison. (2009) The Dust Bowl: An Interactive History Adventure  Capstone Press, 
 Reis, Ronald A. (2008) The Dust Bowl  Chelsea House 
 Sylvester, Kenneth M., and Eric S. A. Rupley, "Revising the Dust Bowl: High above the Kansas Grassland", Environmental History, 17 (July 2012), 603–33.
 Worster, Donald 2004 (1979)Dust Bowl: The Southern Plains in the 1930s  (25. anniversary ed) Oxford University Press. 
 Woody Guthrie, (1963) The (Nearly) Complete Collection of Woody Guthrie Folk Songs, Ludlow Music, New York.
 Alan Lomax, Woody Guthrie, Pete Seeger, (1967) Hard-Hitting Songs for Hard-Hit People, Oak Publications, New York.
 Timothy Egan (2006) The Worst Hard Time , Houghton Mifflin Company, New York, hardcover. .
 Katelan Janke, (1935) Survival in the Storm: The Dust Bowl Diary of Grace Edwards, Dalhart, Texas, Scholastic (September 2002). .
 Sweeney, Kevin Z. (2016). Prelude to the Dust Bowl: Drought in the Nineteenth-Century Southern Plains Norman, OK: University of Oklahoma Press.

 Documentary films 
 1936 – The Plow That Broke the Plains – 25 minutes, directed by Pare Lorentz
 1998 – Surviving the Dust Bowl – 52 minutes, season 10 episode of American Experience documentary tv series
 2012 – The Dust Bowl'' – 240 minutes, 4 episodes, directed by Ken Burns

External links 

 The Dust Bowl photo collection
 "The Dust Bowl", a PBS television series by filmmaker Ken Burns
 The Dust Bowl (EH.Net Encyclopedia)
 Black Sunday, April 14, 1935, Dodge City, KS
 Voices from the Dust Bowl: The Charles L. Todd and Robert Sonkin Migrant Worker Collection, 1940–1941 Library of Congress, American Folklife Center Online collection of archival sound recordings, photographs, and manuscripts
 Farming in the 1930s (Wessels Living History Farm)
 Encyclopedia of Oklahoma History and Culture – Dust Bowl
 Dust, Drought, and Dreams Gone Dry: Oklahoma Women in the Dust Bowl Oral History Project, Oklahoma Oral History Research Program
 Voices of Oklahoma interview with Frosty Troy. First person interview conducted on November 30, 2011 with Frosty Troy talking about the Oklahoma Dust Bowl. Original audio and transcript archived with Voices of Oklahoma oral history project.
 
 

 
Great Plains
Great Depression in the United States
Internal migrations in the United States
History of agriculture in the United States
History of the American West
Environmental disasters in the United States
Soil in the United States
Droughts in the United States
Agriculture in the United States
Agriculture in Oklahoma
Agriculture in Texas
Agriculture in Kansas
Agriculture in Canada
20th-century droughts
1930s natural disasters in the United States
Natural disasters in Oklahoma
1930s droughts